Charles Willis "Chip" Pickering Jr. (born August 10, 1963) is an American businessman and former politician who has been the incumbent chief executive officer of Incompas since 2014.

Pickering represented  as a Republican in the United States House of Representatives between 1997 and 2009.

Early life and education
Pickering was born on 10 August 1963 in Laurel, Mississippi to an American attorney, Charles W. Pickering.

He graduated with bachelor's degree in business administration from the University of Mississippi where he was a legacy member of the Eta chapter of Sigma Chi. He went on to receive a Master of Business Administration from Baylor University in 1989.

Career

Early years
Pickering served as a Southern Baptist missionary to Hungary, after the end of Hungarian government persecution of religious believers.

In 1989, President of the United States, George H. W. Bush, appointed him as a Department of Agriculture liaison to the former European Communist countries.

Pickering served as a staff member of Senator Trent Lott between 1992 and 1996. He helped shape the Telecommunications Act of 1996, the first major overhaul of US telecoms law since 1934. After a  year at the Senate Commerce Committee, Pickering ran for Congress. He defeated eight other Republicans in the primary and won the general election over Democrat John Arthur Eaves Jr. with 61 percent of the vote.

U.S. House of Representatives

Committee assignments
Energy and Commerce Committee
Commerce, Trade and Consumer Protection Subcommittee
Energy and Air Quality Subcommittee
Telecommunications & the Internet Subcommittee

Tenure
In 1998, as chairman of the Basic Research Subcommittee of the U.S. House Science
Committee, Pickering helped oversee the transition from a government research internet to
a commercial internet, as well as the establishment of internet domain names, registries, and
multi-stakeholder governance.

In 2002, Pickering contributed to legislation included in the 2002 Farm Bill that
doubled the conservation reserve and the wetland reserve programs and other conservation
programs administered by the US Department of Agriculture.

Pickering served as George W. Bush's co-chairman for Mississippi in Bush's presidential campaigns in 2000 and 2004.

From 2003 to 2007, he served as vice-chairman of the Energy and Commerce Committee.

In 2008, Pickering received Lewis-Houghton Leadership Award along with Bennie Thompson.

In January 2009, Pickering retired from the House of Representatives.

Post-political career
Pickering is an adjunct professor at the University of Mississippi's Department of Public Leadership Policy where he teaches a bi-monthly seminar class, PPL 211: Political Campaigns.

In 2014, he joined Incompas where he serves as an incumbent chief executive officer. Previously, before joining Incompas, he was a partner with Capitol Resources LLC and represented many companies and organizations.

Pickering also made a brief appearance in the 2006 film, Borat, as a speaker at a church Borat attended.

Personal life

Pickering and his former wife, Leisha, have five sons. Pickering, his father (Charles Pickering), and all five sons share a love for the outdoors and managing land, timber, wildlife habitat and water resources. Charles Pickering is the current Chairman of Wildlife Mississippi, an organization dedicated to the conservation and protection of land, forests, wetlands and wildlife habitat across the state. The Pickering family has farmed and managed land in Jones County Mississippi for eight generations and continues to do so. In 2015, the current three generations of the family acquired, and now manage, land and timber on the Big Black River in Madison County Mississippi. Together, the Pickerings (Charles, Chip and Chip’s five sons) work together in creating wildlife habitats for deer, turkey and waterfowl and managing timber (both pine and bottomland hardwood). The Pickerings have put their land in a permanent conservation easement to protect these valuable natural resources for the generations to come.

Pickering and his sons did two trips to Haiti where they helped build a church and school outside of Port a Prince in 2010 and 2011.

The Pickerings’ divorce was finalized in 2010. Leisha went on to create one of the largest wholesale bath and beauty products company in the country.

In 2015, Pickering remarried Beth Creekmore. The couple has eight children between them, his five sons and her 3 daughters, and will soon have four grandchildren between them. 7 of the children have or will graduate from Ole Miss. Pickering's oldest son, Will, has Autism Spectrum Disorder. He graduated from Belhaven University in Jackson, Ms, and with a Masters in History from George Mason University.

Beth is the executive director of the C-Spire Foundation, a foundation that supports science, technology, engineering and mathematics (STEM) education at all of the Mississippi Universities. She also serves on the Women's Council at Ole Miss, a scholarship and mentoring organization for students at the university.

Pickering is the cousin of a former Mississippi state auditor Stacey Pickering.

On July 16, 2009, Pickering's estranged wife filed a complaint in Hinds County (Mississippi) Circuit Court alleging that Pickering and Elizabeth Creekmore-Byrd had a long-standing adulterous extramarital relationship during his congressional career in Washington, D.C. She further alleged that Creekmore-Byrd insisted that Pickering turn down Mississippi Gov. Haley Barbour's 2007 offer of former Sen. Trent Lott's Senate seat so that Pickering could divorce his wife and the two of them be together. According to Max Blumenthal at The Daily Beast, "In the end, Pickering chose his mistress over his congressional career and his wife."

References

External links
 
Financial disclosures Clarion Ledger, June 15, 2006
Pickering considers job as top lobbyist
Lawmakers' Help for Drug Firm Tests LimitsThe Washington Post, April 29, 2005
 

Living people
1963 births
Baptists from Mississippi
Southern Baptists
University of Mississippi alumni
Baylor University alumni
People from Laurel, Mississippi
Republican Party members of the United States House of Representatives from Mississippi
21st-century American politicians
Conservatism in the United States
Members of Congress who became lobbyists